The 2016 Varsity Shield was contested from 1 February to 18 April 2016. The tournament (also known as the FNB Varsity Shield presented by Steinhoff International for sponsorship reasons) was the sixth season of the Varsity Shield, an annual second-tier inter-university rugby union competition featuring five South African universities.

On 1 March, it was also announced that the round of matches scheduled for 7 March would also be postponed, with the situation at various universities being monitored to determine when the competition will resume. After a meeting by the executive management of Varsity Rugby on 9 March, it was decided that all remaining matches in the competition would be played at neutral venues and that matches should resume on 14 March.

Wits was also promoted to the top-tier Varsity Cup competition for 2017.

Competition rules and information

There were five participating universities in the 2015 Varsity Shield. These teams played each other twice over the course of the season, once at home and once away.

Teams received four points for a win and two points for a draw. Bonus points were awarded to teams that scored four or more tries in a game, as well as to teams that lost a match by seven points or less. Teams were ranked by log points, then points difference (points scored less points conceded).

The top two teams qualified for the title play-offs. These teams played each other in the final, at the home venue of the higher-placed team.

The Varsity Shield winner was promoted to the 2017 Varsity Cup competition, while the bottom team in the Varsity Cup was relegated to the 2017 Varsity Shield. There was also a promotion/relegation match between the 7th-placed team in the Varsity Cup and the Varsity Shield runner-up at the end of the 2016 season. Three new universities will join the Varsity Shield in 2017.

The Varsity Shield used a different scoring system to the regular system. Tries were worth five points as usual, but conversions were worth three points, while penalties and drop goals were only worth two points.

Teams

Standings

The final league standings for the 2016 Varsity Shield were:

Round-by-round

Matches

The following matches were played in the 2016 Varsity Shield:

Round one

Round two

Round three

Round four

Round five

Round six

Round seven

Round eight

Round nine

Round ten

Final

Honours

The honour roll for the 2016 Varsity Shield was as follows:

Players

Player statistics

The following table contain points that were scored in the 2016 Varsity Shield:

Squads

The following squads were named for the 2016 Varsity Shield:

Discipline

The following table contains all the cards handed out during the tournament:

Referees

The following referees officiated matches in the 2016 Varsity Shield:

See also

 Varsity Cup
 2016 Varsity Rugby
 2016 Varsity Cup
 2016 Gold Cup

Notes

References

External links
 
 

2016
2016 in South African rugby union
2016 rugby union tournaments for clubs